Phuket Lager Beer is an Asian beer brand founded in 2002 in Thailand. The beer is brewed with premium German hops and Thai jasmine rice.

History 
Phuket Beer was launched in 2002 as a premium beer, associating itself with the lifestyle of Phuket, a Thai beach resort. Phuket Beer is brewed at the San Miguel Brewery, Thailand, and Phnom Penh Brewery, Cambodia, under the supervision of Tropical Beverage Corporation Company Limited (TROPBEVCO).

Products 
Phuket Beer has no additives or preservatives and is produced in small batches every two to three months. It is 5% alcohol-by-volume (AVB) and has 21 international bitterness units (IBU).  Phuket Beer is available in 640 ml, 330 ml bottle and 330 ml can.

Phuket Beer's logo features a hornbill bird, the company's mascot, with a neck foil design of Laem Promthep (Promthep Cape), a well-known landmark on Phuket island.

Distribution 
Phuket Lager is sold in Thailand and distributed overseas by Import & Export LR, (FRANCE).

Awards 
Phuket Lager received the first gold medal ever for a beer from Thailand at the 2006 Monde Selection Awards. Following this, it was awarded gold medals in 2007-2010 from the organization, earning the high quality award for its five consecutive medals.

References

External links 
 Phuket Beer
 Tropical Beverage Company

Beer in Thailand
2002 establishments in Thailand
Thai drink brands